Weligama Urban Council (WUC) is the local authority for the town of Weligama in the Matara District, Southern Province, Sri Lanka. The WUC is responsible for providing a variety of local public services including roads, sanitation, drains, housing, libraries, public parks and recreational facilities. It has 10 councillors elected using an open list proportional representation system.

Election results

2011 local government election
Results of the local government election held on 17 March 2011:

The following candidates were elected: Mohomad Husein Hajiyar Muhammad; Arindra Sanath Kumara Pelaketiyage; Thakshila Damayanthi Kaluhennedige; Awarikara Galappatthige Chanaka Dilruk; Muhammadu Ibrahim Muhammadu Nisar; Dodanduwa Lebunahewage Titus Pemanath; Oliver Perera Wickramasingha; Ediriweera Pathmasiri; Mohammad Lafir Muhammad Siyam; and Loronsu Hewa Wellekankanamge Chamila Pushpa Kumara.
 
Mohomad Husein Hajiyar Muhammad and Arindra Sanath Kumara Pelaketiyage were appointed Chairman and Deputy Chairman respectively.

References

Government of Matara District
Local authorities in Southern Province, Sri Lanka
Urban councils of Sri Lanka